Elaphus occurs in these biological names:
Cervus elaphus (red deer)
Lucanus elaphus (giant stag beetle)

See also
Elephas, a genus of elephants